Lachnocnema riftensis is a butterfly in the family Lycaenidae. It is found in Kenya and Burundi.

References

Butterflies described in 1996
Taxa named by Michel Libert
Miletinae